The men's fighting 62 kg competition in ju-jitsu at the 2013 World Games took place on 30 July 2013 at the Evagelista Mora Coliseum in Cali, Colombia.

Competition format
A total of six athletes was on the start list of this event. Five of them entered the competition. They fought in round-robin system and athlete with the most points was a winner.

Results

References

Ju-jitsu at the 2013 World Games